Mario Alberto Abadía López (born 3 April 1986) is a Colombian footballer who plays as forward for Platense F.C. in the Honduran Liga Nacional.

References

1986 births
Living people
Footballers from Cali
Colombian footballers
Association football forwards
Colombian expatriate footballers
Expatriate footballers in Panama
Expatriate footballers in El Salvador
Expatriate footballers in Uruguay
Expatriate footballers in Honduras
Liga Nacional de Fútbol Profesional de Honduras players
Tauro F.C. players
Centauros Villavicencio footballers
América de Cali footballers
Patriotas Boyacá footballers
C.D. FAS footballers
C.D. Juventud Independiente players
Platense F.C. players
C.D. Honduras Progreso players
Categoría Primera A players
21st-century Colombian people